Figure skating at the 2012 Winter Youth Olympics took place at the OlympiaWorld venue in Innsbruck, Austria.

Unique to the Youth Olympic Games was a mixed NOC team trophy competition.

Medal summary

Medal table

Events

Eligibility
To be eligible for the 2012 Youth Olympic Games, athletes must have been born between 1 January 1996 and 31 December 1997.

Exception: Male skaters in pairs and ice dance may have been born between 1 January 1994 and 31 December 1997.

Qualification system
The overall quota for the figure skating competition was 76 total skaters, consisting of 38 men and 38 ladies. There were 16 skaters in each of the single skating disciplines (men's and ladies'), 10 pair skating teams, and 12 ice dancing team. The maximum number of entries that qualified by a National Olympic Committee was 2 per event, making 12 (6 men, 6 ladies) the maximum number of entries that a country could qualify.

If a country placed a skater in the first, second or third position in a 2011 World Junior Figure Skating Championships discipline they qualified for two spots in that discipline at the Youth Olympics. All other nations could enter one athlete until a quota spot of 12 for each single event, 7 for pairs and 9 for ice dancing, was reached. There were further four spots for each single event and three spots for pairs/ice dancing at the 2011–12 ISU Junior Grand Prix.

References

ISU results

 
2012 in figure skating
2012 Winter Youth Olympics events
International figure skating competitions hosted by Austria
2012